Gustaaf van Hulstijn (24 August 1884 – 22 April 1976) was a Dutch fencer. He competed in the individual sabre event at the 1908 Summer Olympics.

References

External links
 

1884 births
1976 deaths
Dutch male sabre fencers
Olympic fencers of the Netherlands
Fencers at the 1908 Summer Olympics
People from Batavia, Dutch East Indies
20th-century Dutch people